Esmond is a locality located in the Shire of Moira local government area. Esmond post office opened on 22 November 1893 and was closed on 29 October 1929.

References

Towns in Victoria (Australia)
Shire of Moira